INS Dega , is a naval air station of the Indian Navy. It is located in Visakhapatnam, Andhra Pradesh on the east coast of India.

History 
The Indian Navy initially started aviation operations in Visakhapatnam in the late 1970s, with the construction of four helipads adjacent to the civil airfield. The civilian Visakhapatnam Airport was transferred to the Directorate General of Civil Aviation in 1981. The air station was then called Naval Air Station, Visakhapatnam. Additional hangars, maintenance facilities and an operations complex were constructed soon after.

On 21 October 1991, the air station was renamed and formally commissioned as INS Dega by then Vice Admiral Laxminarayan Ramdas. It is named for the Telugu language word for a big and powerful bird of the eagle family.

Units
Indian naval air squadrons based at INS Dega include:
 INAS 551, a fighter training squadron BAE Hawk AJT aircraft
 INAS 311, a reconnaissance squadron operating Dornier 228 aircraft
 INAS 321, a search and rescue squadron operating HAL Chetak helicopters
 INAS 333, an anti-submarine warfare squadron operating Kamov Ka-28 helicopters
 INAS 350, a logistics and transport squadron operating Sikorsky UH-3 Sea King helicopters
 a UAV squadron, operating DRDO Lakshya pilotless targeting UAVs
 The BAE Systems Hawk advanced jet trainer was inducted on 6 November 2013 by then Chief of Naval Staff (India), Admiral Devendra Kumar Joshi

As of 2014 preparations have begun to deploy and permanently base a full squadron of Mikoyan MiG-29 fighters to strengthen the security of India's eastern seaboard. In order to decrease the growing flight traffic in the base, a new base has been under consideration by the navy at Badangi, near Vizayanagaram

The plan for the expansion of the airbase envisages a massive increase in size as well as capabilities. In the final scenario, from the present size of 1100 acres, the INS Dega will be spread out to over 1500 acres.
A parallel taxi track at the base is also in the offing which will cut down the runway occupancy time.

See also
 Indian navy 
 List of Indian Navy bases
 List of active Indian Navy ships

 Integrated commands and units
 Armed Forces Special Operations Division
 Defence Cyber Agency
 Integrated Defence Staff
 Integrated Space Cell
 Indian Nuclear Command Authority
 Indian Armed Forces
 Special Forces of India

 Other lists
 Strategic Forces Command
 List of Indian Air Force stations
 List of Indian Navy bases
 India's overseas military bases

References

Dega
Dega
Airports in Andhra Pradesh
Economy of Visakhapatnam
Buildings and structures in Visakhapatnam
Transport in Visakhapatnam
1970s establishments in Andhra Pradesh